During the 199394 season, the Liga ACBthe top tier of the Spanish basketball league systemcontained 20 teams. The winning team was Real Madrid Baloncesto.

Regular season

Classification playoffs
TDK Manresa, Festina Andorra, Taugrés Baskonia and Cáceres CB finished in the previous season between the positions 11th and 20th, so they played a classification game against Unicaja Polti, Elmar León, Caja San Fernando and Pamesa Valencia respectively. After this games, the final classification for the Championship playoffs was modified:

4. Festina Andorra
5. CB Estudiantes
6. Cáceres CB
7. Caja San Fernando
8. Unicaja Polti
9. TDK Manresa
10. Taugrés Baskonia
11. Pamesa Valencia
12. Elmar León

Relegation playoffs

Championship Playoffs

External links
 ACB.com 
 Linguasport 

Liga ACB seasons